Sybra iconica is a species of beetle in the family Cerambycidae. It was described by Pascoe in 1865. It contains two subspecies, Sybra iconica clarevitticollis and Sybra iconica iconica.

References

iconica
Beetles described in 1865